The American Credit Union Mortgage Association (ACUMA) is a U.S. trade organization for credit unions that are involved in the origination and securitization of real estate loans. ACUMA hosts industry conferences, provides testimony and media commentary on real estate-related issues before the United States Congress, produces the ACUMA Pipeline magazine, and coordinates educational initiatives relating to housing finance. The organization is headquartered in Wisconsin.

References

External links 
 ACUMA web site
 "CU Lending in 2008: The Big Picture," Credit Union Magazine

Trade associations based in the United States
Credit unions of the United States
Mortgage industry companies of the United States